Storm Murphy (born January 3, 1999) is an American college basketball player for the Virginia Tech Hokies of the Atlantic Coast Conference (ACC). He previously played for the Wofford Terriers.

Early life and high school career
Murphy attended Middleton High School in Middleton, Wisconsin. He joined the Chicago-based Mac Irvin Fire of the Nike EYBL after his junior season and averaged 8.3 points, 2.9 rebounds, and 4.6 assists per game, distinguishing himself among other top prospects. As a senior, Murphy averaged 19.9 points, 4.8 assists and 2 steals per game. He was a First Team All-Big Eight Conference selection during his junior and senior seasons and earned honorable-mention all-state recognition as a senior from the Wisconsin Basketball Coaches Association. Murphy finished his career with 1,094 points and a school-record 280 assists. He committed to Wofford over offers from South Dakota, Southern Utah, Navy and UTEP, among others.

College career

Murphy averaged 6.3 points, 4 assists and 2.2 rebounds per game as a freshman, starting 28 of 34 games. As a sophomore, he averaged 8 points and 3.3 assists per game on a team that won 30 games and achieved a national ranking. Murphy averaged 11.9 points and 3.5 assists per game as a junior. He was named to the Second Team All-Southern Conference. On January 23, 2021, Murphy scored a career-high 28 points in a 91–78 win against Western Carolina. As a senior, he averaged 17.8 points, 4.3 assists, and 3.3 rebounds per game, shooting 40 percent from three-point range. Murphy was selected to the First Team All-Southern Conference. At Wofford, he was also well respected for his academic prowess, clutch play, and leadership ability. After the Terriers were eliminated from the Southern Conference tournament and his graduation from Wofford, Storm opted to enter the transfer portal for his remaining year of eligibility and received attention from Wisconsin, Baylor, Colorado and Missouri. Murphy ultimately chose to transfer to Virginia Tech, after his previous coach Mike Young reached out to him with interest.

After earning the 7th seed in the 2022 ACC tournament, Murphy and the Hokies won four games in four days on their way to the school's first ever ACC title, clinching an NCAA tournament bid in the process. Young and Murphy have won conference championships at both Wofford and VT together.

Career statistics

College

|-
| style="text-align:left;"| 2017–18
| style="text-align:left;"| Wofford
|| 34 || 28 || 27.4 || .438 || .383 || .842 || 2.2 || 4.0 || .9 || .0 || 6.3
|-
| style="text-align:left;"| 2018–19 
| style="text-align:left;"| Wofford
|| 34 || 33 || 26.2 || .500 || .472 || .844 || 1.8 || 3.3 || .7 || .0 || 8.0
|-
| style="text-align:left;"| 2019–20 
| style="text-align:left;"| Wofford 
|| 34 || 34 || 31.4 || .464 || .424 || .865 || 2.6 || 3.5 || .7 || .0 || 11.9
|-
| style="text-align:left;"| 2020–21
| style="text-align:left;"| Wofford
|| 24 || 24 || 34.4 || .470 || .400 || .843 || 3.3 || 4.3 || 1.0 || .0 || 17.8
|-
| style="text-align:left;"| 2021–22
| style="text-align:left;"| Virginia Tech
|| 36 || 36 || 26.9 || .433 || .358|| .750|| 1.9 || 2.9 || 0.4 || .0 || 8.0
|- class="sortbottom"
| style="text-align:center;" colspan="2"| Career
|| 162 || 155 || 28.9 || .462 || .405 || .837 || 2.3 || 3.7 || 0.7 || 0.0 || 9.9

Personal life
Murphy graduated from Wofford with a degree in finance. His first name is his mother's maiden name.

See also
 List of NCAA Division I men's basketball career games played leaders

References

External links
Virginia Tech Hokies bio
Wofford Terriers bio

1999 births
Living people
American men's basketball players
Basketball players from Wisconsin
Point guards
Sportspeople from Madison, Wisconsin
Virginia Tech Hokies men's basketball players
Wofford Terriers men's basketball players